The Krešimir Ćosić Hall is a multi-purpose indoor sports arena located in Zadar, Croatia. The arena is home to the KK Zadar basketball club and also hosts concerts, conventions and other sporting, business and entertainment events. 

From October 2008, its official name became Krešimir Ćosić Hall, named after the legendary Croatian basketball player Krešimir Ćosić. Former name of the arena was Sportski centar Višnjik. The arena's nickname is "Peka", which is a traditional Dalmatian cookware of the same name. For several months during 2008, it was the largest indoor arena in Croatia, and now it is the third largest.

Events

The arena was used as one of the venues during the 2009 World Men's Handball Championship. Also, the Croatia Davis Cup team has played at the arena for the 2008 Davis Cup World Group Play-offs and 2016 Davis Cup World Group semifinals.The arena was also host for group matches during 2021 Women's European Volleyball Championship.

See also
 List of indoor arenas in Croatia
 List of indoor arenas in Europe

References

External links

Official site
Venue information
Gradovi domaćini - Svjetsko prvenstvo u rukometu 2009. 

Indoor arenas in Croatia
Basketball venues in Croatia
Handball venues in Croatia
Sports venues completed in 2008
Sport in Zadar
KK Zadar
2008 establishments in Croatia
Hall, Krešimir Ćosić